Ipermarca is a monotypic moth genus of the family Erebidae. Its only species, Ipermarca monovittata, is found on Madagascar. Both the genus and the species were first described by Emilio Berio in 1966.

References

Calpinae
Monotypic moth genera